Tiggy (born 1970 as Charlotte Vigel) is a Danish musical artist and radio host.

Biography 
Charlotte Vigel was born and brought up in Bornholm where, thanks to her parents' great interest in amateur theatricals, she made her stage debut at the age of 10 years. As a result of her theatre performances, it was only natural that she developed a great interest in dancing and this led to her taking part in a number of competitions all over Denmark as well as forming her own dance group.

When Tiggy turned sixteen she began to concentrate more on music. She became the lead singer in both a dance band and a rock band and performed at numerous concerts. She went on tour with Next Stop Soviet and took part in the Danish weekly magazine, Se og Hør Melodi Grand Prix competition, winning a place in the finals. After an open-air concert, Tiggy was offered a record contract by a German producer from Hamburg.

In 1994, after a lot of encouragement to develop her singing talent more seriously, Tiggy started taking lessons at a music school in Lund, Sweden. Shortly afterwards, she enrolled at the Copenhagen Academy of Music.

In 1995, Tiggy attended an audition and was straight away taken on as member of a girl trio. In April that year their single, Surprise Surprise was released and the following month, the trio was invited to perform on "Eleva2ren", a popular Danish TV entertainment programme. Tiggy was offered the job of singer in the Danish Ny Teater production of the musical farce, "La Cage Aux Folles" and ended up both singing and dancing as well as performing a small acting role. Carried away by working, Tiggy went on to land an engagement in Betty Glosted's summer cabaret.

For years now, Tiggy has been a solo singer on several "Krumme" (a popular Danish children's comedy film) soundtracks, so she was also a soloist on "Krummernes Jul" (the Christmas version of the film series). She has also been the lead singer in several bands including Street Beat and Legend.

In 1996, Tiggy's collaboration with Danish label Flex Records started. This was in connection with the song Ring A Ling, written by CMN aka Christian Møller Nielsen, Heidi Lykke Larsen and Henrik Carlsen and produced by Hartmann & Langhoff, who also worked with Aqua and Me & My and other Bubblegum dance groups.  The song was a smash hit, and shot to No. 1 on the official single sales list after only eight days in store.  The song went platinum in record time (less than a month) and stayed at No. 1 for 8 weeks.

The follow-up single Simsalabim, again produced by Hartmann & Langhoff, was released on 16 April 1997 and followed in Ring A Ling'''s footsteps by immediately zooming to No. 1 on the sales list.  Tiggy's debut album, Fairy Tales was released on 7 May 1997 which was also extremely popular.  This album also took Tiggy's music outside Denmark and Fairy Tales was released in several countries including Mexico, Japan, Spain, Belgium and Russia.

Charlotte Vigel currently works as a radio-host on a Danish radio show Morgenhyrderne.

 Discography 
 Albums 
1997 - Fairy Tales1999 - Tiggy''

Singles

References

External links 
Tiggy biography, news and discography at Bubblegum Dancer

1970 births
Living people
English-language singers from Denmark
21st-century Danish women  singers